Kéniéba Cercle is a subdivision of the Kayes Region of Mali.  The administrative center (chef-lieu) is the town of Kéniéba.  

Kéniéba Cercle contains the Malian section of the hilly Bambouk region, the historic gold mining region of the Ghana Empire and the Mali Empire.  Kéniéba Cercle is divided from the Senegalese Bambouk by the valley of the Falémé River.

The cercle is subdivided into twelve communes:

Bayé
Dabia
Dialafara
Dombia
Faléa
Faraba
Guénégoré
Kassama
Kéniéba
Kroukoto
Sagalo
Sitakilly

References

External links
.

Cercles of Mali